Whitesville, New Jersey may refer to:

Whitesville, Monmouth County, New Jersey
Whitesville, Ocean County, New Jersey